Foolad Arena (Fulâd Ârena) is a newly built stadium in Ahvaz, which was opened on 13 November 2018. It hosts the home matches of Foolad since March 2019. The stadium was planned to be completed by November 2013, which was changed to middle of 2018 due to financial problems.

The competition for the project was won by Kowsar Company's design. The stadium is being built on the location of Foolad's corporate housings, Divistdastgah Town and next to 5,000 capacity Foolad Khuzestan Stadium which is used by the club's academy, Foolad Novin.

Design
It will seat 30,655 people for football matches and up to 35,000 people for other events. The arena will be built with cutting-edge technology and will incorporate sustainability projects - mainly concerning the use and reuse of water, electricity, etc. The approximate investment is $40 million. 100% of the investment in the arena comes from the private sector, displaying the capacity for partnership between the club and an innovative company.

Building and facilities
The stadium is located in the plan Foolad Sports Complex, which is included 27,000 and 5,000 capacity football stadiums, training camp, futsal arena, volleyball and basketball halls and two pools which one of them opened in 2012. The project includes cafeterias, restrooms, including access for the handicapped, a press area, a convention center, and a trophy room. Along the stadium, a hotel was built in 2010 and a hospital will be built until 2015.

The Divistdastgah Metro Station of Ahvaz Metro will be opened in 2020. The parking capacity of the complex is 4500 cars.

Gallery

See also
 Ghadir Stadium

References

External links

Football venues in Iran
Sport in Ahvaz
Sport in Iran
Sports venues completed in 2018
Buildings and structures in Khuzestan Province
2018 establishments in Iran